is a Japanese singer and voice actress from Fukuoka Prefecture, Japan. Shishido debuted as an idol singer with Sony Records in 1990 with the single "Cosmic Rendezvous." In 1992, she left her management and began releasing music independently.

Around the same time Shishido left her management, she also debuted as a voice actress, with her breakthrough role being Mikako Koda from Neighborhood Story. Other notable roles she has played include Onpu Segawa from Ojamajo Doremi, Rosemary Applefield from Ashita no Nadja,  Viper from Reborn!, M.O.M.O. from the Xenosaga series, Diana and Luna from the Jewelpet series, and June Amou from Pretty Rhythm: Rainbow Live and King of Prism.

Early life 
Shishido was born in Fukuoka Prefecture, Japan as the only daughter of an old Samurai family; her grandfather was a buddhist monk. When Shishido was two years old, she moved to Hiroshima with her mother after her parents divorced. She was a cheerleader at school. Prior to being scouted, she was studying abroad in Seattle, Washington.

Career

Musical career 
Citing Etsuko Ichihara as her inspiration, in 1989, Shishido decided to audition for a contest hosted by Lotte through the encouragement of her mother. At the age of 16, Shishido was selected as the winner out of 85,000 contestants and appeared on their television commercial in the following year. Shishido's debut single, titled , was released in 1990. Known by her idol nickname , Shishido also joined the members of Lip's and Rakutenshi to form the project group Nanatsuboshi. During her time as an idol, she faced strict regulations during public appearances and was not allowed to speak out of turn, nor was she allowed to befriend other idols from rival managements.

In 1992, Shishido terminated her contract, citing interest in other career paths such as acting and film. Shishido continued her singing career as an independent singer. Her first indie album, Set Me Free, released in 1995 and had cost  to produce. Shishido's album was positively received, and Neil Strauss of The New York Times compared her "ripe, melodic voice" to Debbie Gibson and Liz Phair.

Since meeting guitarist Kohei Shigihara, most of Shishido's music has been composed by him. The first song produced by the two was titled  in 2006, which Shishido describes as the song "[seeming] to have been [her] image" and that "[t]hough [she is] refreshing, [she sings] the sense of the vanity of life of the man and woman".

On May 9, 2010, Shishido celebrated her 20th anniversary in the music industry with a commemorative performance that was streamed live on Ustream. Shishido's performance set a record of having the most people view her video on the entire history of the website.

Voice acting career 
Shishido's first start at a voice acting career was in 1992, when she voiced Uni Charm Password from the OVA series of KO Beast. In 1995, she broke through with her first leading role as Mikako Koda from Neighborhood Story and was encouraged to audition after producer Hiromi Seki had heard her speaking voice through her album, Do-Re-Mi-Fa-So-La-Ti-Do-Shi-Shi-Do-Ru-Mi. Shishido auditioned for the role of Doremi in Ojamajo Doremi but did not get the part. Despite that, she was later cast as Onpu, a role that boosted her popularity as a voice actress.

Filmography

Film

Television

OVA

Original Net Animation

Video games

CD Drama
Digimon Drama CD Natsu e No Tobira as Natsu-chan

Live-action films

Dubbing 
Hello Kitty's Furry Tale Theater - Fangora

Discography

Studio albums 
 Do-Re-Mi-Fa-So-La-Ti-Do-Shi-Shi-Do-Ru-Mi (1990)
 Punsuka (1992)
 Set Me Free (1995)
 Shinya Haikai (1997)
 Bambi Garden (1999)
 Rumi Roll (2003)
 Cherbourgh → Brighton (2010)
 Onna (2012)
 Luminescence (2013)
 Eight (2017)

Compilation albums 
 Idol Miracle Bible Series: Rumi Shishido (2005)

Singles

References

External links 
  
 
 

1973 births
Living people
Voice actresses from Hiroshima
Actors from Hiroshima
Japanese film actresses
Japanese idols
Japanese video game actresses
Japanese voice actresses
Musicians from Fukuoka Prefecture
Voice actresses from Fukuoka Prefecture
Voice actors from Fukuoka
20th-century Japanese actresses
20th-century Japanese singers
20th-century Japanese women singers
21st-century Japanese actresses
21st-century Japanese singers
21st-century Japanese women singers